Amblycerus is a genus of pea and bean weevils in the beetle family Chrysomelidae. There are more than 60 described species in Amblycerus.

Species
These 63 species belong to the genus Amblycerus:

 Amblycerus acapulcensis Kingsolver
 Amblycerus atrogaster Ribeiro-Costa, 1998
 Amblycerus atypicus Ribeiro-Costa, 1999
 Amblycerus baracoensis Kingsolver
 Amblycerus bidentatus Ribeiro-Costa, 1999
 Amblycerus cerdnicola Kingsolver
 Amblycerus chapadicola Ribeiro-Costa, 1998
 Amblycerus chapini Kingsolver
 Amblycerus crassipunctatus Ribeiro-Costa, 1999
 Amblycerus cuernavace
 Amblycerus dispar (Sharp, 1885)
 Amblycerus epsilon Kingsolver
 Amblycerus eustrophoides (Schaeffer, 1904)
 Amblycerus evangelinae
 Amblycerus flavidus (Chevrolat, 1877)
 Amblycerus guazumicola Johnson & Kingsolver
 Amblycerus guerrerensis
 Amblycerus guinaeensis Thunberg, 1815
 Amblycerus imperfectus Kingsolver
 Amblycerus ireriae Romero, Johnson & Kingsolver, 1996
 Amblycerus isabelae Ribeiro-Costa, 1999
 Amblycerus isocalcaratus Ribeiro-Costa, 1999
 Amblycerus japonicus Thunberg, 1815
 Amblycerus kingsolveri Ribeiro-Costa, 1993
 Amblycerus longesuturalis (Pic, 1954)
 Amblycerus luciae Ribeiro-Costa, 1999
 Amblycerus maculicollis Ribeiro-Costa, 2000
 Amblycerus mariae
 Amblycerus marinonii Ribeiro-Costa, 1993
 Amblycerus martorelli Bridwell
 Amblycerus medialis Ribeiro-Costa, Vieira & Manfio, 2014
 Amblycerus megalobus Ribeiro-Costa, 1998
 Amblycerus mourei Ribeiro-Costa, 1998
 Amblycerus multiflocculus Kingsolver
 Amblycerus nigromarginatus (Motschulsky, 1874)
 Amblycerus obscurus (Sharp, 1885)
 Amblycerus piurae (Pierce, 1915)
 Amblycerus pollens (Sharp, 1855)
 Amblycerus profaupar Ribeiro-Costa, 2000
 Amblycerus pterocarpae Kingsolver
 Amblycerus puncticollis (Gyllenhal, 1839)
 Amblycerus pusillus Ribeiro-Costa, 2000
 Amblycerus robiniae (Fabricius, 1781)
 Amblycerus schwarzi Kingsolver, 1970
 Amblycerus sclerolobii Ribeiro-Costa, 2000
 Amblycerus scutellaris (Sharp, 1885)
 Amblycerus similaris Ribeiro-Costa, 1999
 Amblycerus similis Ribeiro-Costa, 1999
 Amblycerus sosia Ribeiro-Costa & Kingsolver, 1993
 Amblycerus spiniger Ribeiro-Costa, 2000
 Amblycerus spondiae Kingsolver
 Amblycerus stridulator Kingsolver, Romero-Napoles & Johnson, 1993
 Amblycerus tachigaliae Kingsolver
 Amblycerus teutoniensis Ribeiro-Costa & Kingsolver, 1993
 Amblycerus vega Kingsolver
 Amblycerus veracruz
 Amblycerus virens (Jekel, 1885)
 Amblycerus virescens Ribeiro-Costa, 1998
 Amblycerus viridans Ribeiro-Costa, 1998
 Amblycerus viridis Ribeiro-Costa, 1998
 Amblycerus vitis (Schaeffer, 1907)
 Amblycerus whiteheadi Kingsolver, 1991
 Amblycerus wolcotti Kingsolver

References

Further reading

External links

 

Bruchinae
Articles created by Qbugbot
Chrysomelidae genera